Spengler is a German-language occupational surname, literally meaning "metal worker" or "tin knocker". It may refer to:

 Alexander Spengler (1827–1901), the first Davos doctor specializing in tuberculosis
 Bruno Spengler (born 1983), a Canadian racecar driver
 Egon Spengler, a character from the Ghostbusters films
 John Spengler, the Akira Yamaguchi Professor of Environmental Health and Human Habitation at Harvard T.H. Chan School of Public Health
 Jörg Spengler (born 1938), German sailor
 Joseph J. Spengler (1912–1991), American economist, statistician and historian of economic thought
 Lorenz Spengler (1720–1807), Swiss-born Danish decorative artist and naturalist
 Oswald Spengler (1880–1936), German author, writer of The Decline of the West
 Pierre Spengler, a European film producer
 Volker Spengler (1939-2020), German actor
 Spengler, pen name of David P. Goldman

Occupational surnames
German-language surnames